The 398th Fighter-Interceptor Squadron is an inactive United States Air Force unit, last assigned to the Air Defense Command, being stationed at Hamilton AFB, California.   The squadron was inactivated on 8 February 1957.

History
Air defense and replacement training until March 1944, and afterward replacement training plus air support for army maneuvers until August 1945. The 398th FIS was activated in November 1956 at Hamilton AFB and scheduled to receive F-104s. Before personnel or equipment were in place, the unit was inactivated on 18 February 1957.

Lineage
 Constituted 398th Fighter Squadron on 26 May 1943
 Activated on 1 August 1943
 Redesignated: 398th Fighter-Bomber Squadron on 5 April 1944
 Redesignated: 398th Fighter Squadron on 5 June 1944
 Inactivated on 7 November 1945
 Redesignated: 398th Fighter-Interceptor Squadron on 18 September 1956
 Activated on 18 November 1956
 Inactivated on 8 February 1957.

Assignments
 369th Fighter (later Fighter-Bomber; Fighter) Group, 1 August 1943
 II Tactical Air Division, 10 August 1945
 III Tactical Air Command, 1 September 1945
 Attached to 372d Fighter Group, 2 October – 7 November 1945
 XIX Tactical Air Command, 25 October – 7 November 1945
 Air Defense Command
 Western Air Defense Force, 18 November 1956 – 8 February 1957.

Stations
 Hamilton Field, California, August 1943
 Marysville Army Airfield, California, 3 November 1943
 Oroville Army Airfield, California, 29 January 1944
 Hamilton Field, California, 13 March 1944
 DeRidder Army Airbase, Louisiana, 27 March 1944
 Stuttgart Army Airfield, Arkansas, 8 February 1945
 Alexandria AAF, Louisiana, 2 October – 7 November 1945
 Hamilton AFB, California, 18 November 1956 – 8 February 1957

Aircraft
 P-39 Airacobra, 1943–1944
 A-36 Apache, 1944
 P-40 Warhawk 1944–1945
 P-51 Mustang, 1945.

References

 
 A Handbook of Aerospace Defense Organization 1946–1980, by Lloyd H. Cornett and Mildred W. Johnson, Office of History, Aerospace Defense Center, Peterson Air Force Base, Colorado

External links

398
Military units and formations in California